Donnington railway station was a railway station in Shropshire, England. It was built by the Shropshire Union Railway who opened it in 1849, Passenger service ceased in September 1964, and freight service ceased on 4 October 1965.

References

Further reading

External links

Disused railway stations in Shropshire
Railway stations in Great Britain opened in 1849
Railway stations in Great Britain closed in 1964
Former London and North Western Railway stations
Beeching closures in England